BelMarket (БелМаркет) is a chain of supermarkets in Belarus. It is the first national food chain in that country. BelMarket was started as a project by Russian companies X5 Retail Group and A1 in 2007.

Locations 
According to, the BelMarket website:

 Minsk Region
 Pyershamayski District, Minsk (2 supermarkets)
 Frunzyenski District, Minsk
 Zavodski District, Minsk
 Savyetski District, Minsk
 Molodechno (2 supermarkets)
 Zhodino (6 supermarkets)
 Mogilev Region
 Bobruisk
 Mogilev (11 supermarkets)

Link 
 BelMarket Homepage
 Pictures of BelMarket stores (in Minsk Oblast)

References

Supermarkets of Belarus
Companies based in Minsk
Retail companies established in 2007
Belarusian brands